Stagmatophora is a genus of moths in the family Cosmopterigidae.

Species
Stagmatophora acanthodes 
Stagmatophora basanistis  
Stagmatophora chopardella  
Stagmatophora clinarcha  
Stagmatophora diakonoffi  
Stagmatophora diversoplaga  
Stagmatophora erebinthia  
Stagmatophora flexa   
Stagmatophora heydeniella (Fischer von Röslerstamm, 1838)
Stagmatophora haploceros Turner, 1926 
Stagmatophora luciliella  
Stagmatophora niphocrana   
Stagmatophora notoleuca  
Stagmatophora phalacra Meyrick, 1909 
Stagmatophora pilana  
Stagmatophora tetradesma
Stagmatophora trimitra  
Stagmatophora wyattella Barnes & Busck, 1920

S. spintheropa probably belongs in Asymphorodes.

Status unclear
Stagmatophora argyroela Walsingham, 1907

References
Natural History Museum Lepidoptera genus database

Cosmopteriginae
Moth genera